The 2017–18 National Women's League, was the 16th season of the edition of the first-tier women's club football competition in Nepal organized by the All Nepal Football Association. Nepal A.P.F. Club won their first title after defeating defending champions Nepal Police Club in the final.

Teams

Group stage

Group A

Group B

Knockout stage

Semi-finals

|}

Third place play-off

|}

Final

|}

Awards

References

External links 

2017–18 in Nepalese football
Nepal